Vasilyevka is a rural locality (a settlement) in Pervoertilskoye Rural Settlement, Ertilsky District, Voronezh Oblast, Russia. The population was 29 as of 2010.

Geography 
Vasilyevka is located 8 km south of Ertil (the district's administrative centre) by road. Ertil is the nearest rural locality.

References 

Rural localities in Ertilsky District